Harrison Power Station is a 1.9-gigawatt (1,984 MW) coal-fired electricity-generating power station located in Haywood, West Virginia, owned and operated by FirstEnergy. It has one of the tallest chimneys in the world , built in 1994.

Its three identical units, rated at 650 MW each at the time of completion, were launched into service in 1972, 1973, and 1974 by Allegheny Energy at a cost of $400 million to build.

See also

 List of tallest freestanding structures in the world

References

External links
Harrison Fact Sheet
Chimney Diagram

Energy infrastructure completed in 1972
Energy infrastructure completed in 1973
Energy infrastructure completed in 1974
Towers completed in 1994
Chimneys in the United States
FirstEnergy
Buildings and structures in Harrison County, West Virginia
Towers in West Virginia
Coal-fired power stations in West Virginia
1972 establishments in West Virginia